Batkid Begins is a 2015 American documentary film co-produced (with Liza Meak), co-written (with Kurt Kuenne) and directed by Dana Nachman. The documentary follows Miles Scott, an American child and cancer survivor. His wish was to be "Batkid", a sidekick of the eponymous comic book superhero Batman. Once the request went out, thousands of volunteers, city officials, businesses and supporters rallied to turn San Francisco, California into "Gotham City" – the fictional home city of Batman, on November 15, 2013, for one of the largest and most elaborate Make-A-Wish projects ever staged. The film was released by Warner Bros. Pictures on June 26, 2015.

Cast
 Miles Scott as Batkid / Himself
 Eric Johnston as Batman
 Philip Watt as Riddler
 Mike Jutan as Penguin
 Sue Graham Johnston as Damsel in Distress
 Joel Zimei as Lou Seal
 Or Oppenheimer as Catwoman
 Ron Oppenheimer as Superman
 Nick Scott as himself
 Natalie Scott as herself
 Ryan Scott as himself
 Ed Lee as Mayor of San Francisco
 Greg Suhr as Chief of Police	
 Naomi Kyle as herself
 Patricia Wilson as Executive Director
 Chris Taylor as Deputy Editor
 Hans Zimmer as himself
 Ama Daetz as Newscaster

Release
The film premiered at the Slamdance Film Festival on January 24, 2015. On March 12, 2015, Warner Bros. acquired the film. The film was released by Warner Bros. on June 26, 2015.

Reception
Batkid Begins received positive reviews from critics. On Rotten Tomatoes, the film has a rating of 82%, based on 60 reviews, with a rating of 7.1/10. The site's critical consensus reads, "Sweet and unabashedly sentimental, Batkid Begins is an uplifting look at a selfless act that brought a city together." On Metacritic, the film has a score of 63 out of 100, based on 14 critics, indicating "generally favorable reviews".

References

External links
 

2015 films
2015 documentary films
American documentary films
New Line Cinema films
Documentary films about children with disability
Documentary films about cancer
Documentary films about San Francisco
Documentary films about fandom
Batman in other media
Warner Bros. films
2010s English-language films
2010s American films